Joe Connolly (born 13 October 1956) is an Irish former hurler who played as a centre-forward at senior level for the Galway county team.

Born in Castlegar, County Galway, Connolly first played competitive hurling whilst at school in St Mary's College, Galway. He arrived on the inter-county scene at the age of sixteen when he first linked up with the Galway minor team, before later joining the under-21 side. He made his senior debut in the 1976 championship. Connolly went on to play a key role for Galway for almost a decade, and won one All-Ireland medal. An All-Ireland runner-up on two occasions, Connolly captained Galway to the All-Ireland title in 1980.

As a member of the Connacht inter-provincial team at various times, Connolly won two Railway Cup medals. At club level he is a one-time All-Ireland medallist with Castlegar. In addition to this he also won two Connacht medals and two championship medals.

With University College Galway, Connolly won one Fitzgibbon Cup medal.

Throughout his career Connolly made 22 championship appearances for Galway. His retirement came following the conclusion of the 1984 championship.

As the third eldest of the Connolly dynasty, many of his brothers, John, Pádraic, Michael, Tom, Gerry and Murt, played with distinction for Castlegar and Galway. His son, Barry Connolly, has lined out for the Dublin senior team.

In retirement from playing, Connolly became involved in team management and coaching. He has served as a selector with the Galway senior team, while at club level he also served as manager of the Castlegar senior team.

Playing career

University
During his tenure at University College Galway, Connolly was a key member of the university's senior hurling team. In 1977 he lined out at full-forward as UCG reached the final of the inter-varsities championship. A 1–14 to 1–12 defeat of St Patrick's College, Maynooth gave him a Fitzgibbon Cup medal.

He earned his B.A. from the university in 1978.

Club
Connolly joined the Castlegar senior hurling panel in 1974, however, the team were beaten in their quest for three championships in-a-row.

In 1979 Connolly was a key member of the team as Castlegar reached the championship final. First-time finalists Kinvara faced an uphill battle against roll of honour leaders Castlegar. A 2–13 to 0–6 victory gave Connolly his first championship medal. Old rivals Tremane provided the opposition in the subsequent provincial decider, however, a 4–12 to 0–5 victory gave Connolly a third Connacht medal. Castlegar later became the first team from Connacht to qualify for the All-Ireland decider. Antrim and Ulster champions Ballycastle provided the opposition, as Connolly and his four brothers faced six Donnelly brothers on the opposing team. Olcan McLaverty scored a goal in the first half, however, this failed to ignite the Ballycastle attack. Five minutes into the second half Liam Mulryan turned a Connolly pass into the net to take the lead. Ballycastle cut this led to just a point, however, two points from brothers Gerry and Joe Connolly set up a 1–11 to 1–8 victory and an All-Ireland Senior Club Hurling Championship medal for Connolly.

After losing back-to-back championship decider in 1982 and 1983, Castlegar were under pressure to deliver in 1984. A 3–10 to 0–11 victory over Killimordaly gave Connolly his second championship medal. Tooreen fell by 2–15 to 2–7 in the subsequent provincial final, giving Connolly a fourth Connacht medal. Castlegar later faced St. Martin's of Kilkenny in the All-Ireland decider. Tom Moran scored two goals which seemed to put St. Martin's in the driving seat, however, a goal by Kilkenny man Martin O'Shea for Castlegar secured a draw. The replay saw Tom Moran take centre stage once again, as St. Martin's secured a 1–13 to 1–10 victory.

Inter-county
Connolly first came to prominence on the inter-county scene with the Galway minor and under-21 teams, however, he enjoyed little success in these grades. He made his senior championship debut on 18 July 1976 in a 3–12 to 3–9 All-Ireland quarter-final defeat of Kerry.

After three years of penultimate stage defeats, Galway shocked four-in-a-row hopefuls Cork in the All-Ireland semi-final and qualified for an All-Ireland final showdown with Kilkenny in 1979. In one of the worst All-Ireland finals of the decade, Galway goalkeeper Séamus Shinnors had an absolute nightmare of a game.  A 70-yards free by Liam "Chunky" O'Brien after just four minutes dipped, hit off Shinnors and ended up in the Galway net. Galway fought back and went two points up twelve minutes into the second half, however, they failed to score for the rest of the game. Four minutes before the end of the game another long-range free for Kilkenny ended up in the net behind Shinnors. It was a score which summed up the day for Connolly's side as Kilkenny went on to win by 2–12 to 1–8.

In 1980 Connolly was appointed captain as Galway defeated Kildare and Offaly to reach a second consecutive All-Ireland final.  Munster champions Limerick provided the opposition on this occasion and an exciting championship decider followed. Bernie Forde and P. J. Molloy goals for Galway meant that the men from the west led by 2–7 to 1–5 at half-time.  Éamonn Cregan single-handedly launched the Limerick counter-attack in the second-half.  Over the course of the game he scored 2–7, including an overhead goal and a point in which he showed the ball to full-back Conor Hayes and nonchalantly drove the ball over the bar. It was not enough to stem the tide and Galway went on to win the game by 2–15 to 3–9. It was the county's first All-Ireland title since 1923 and the celebrations surpassed anything ever seen in Croke Park.  It took Connolly ten minutes to reach the rostrum in the Hogan Stand to collect the Liam MacCarthy Cup, however, once there he delivered, in his native Irish, one of the most famous acceptance speeches of all-time.

"People of Galway, after fifty-seven years the All-Ireland title is back in Galway...It's wonderful to be from Galway on a day like today.  There are people back in Galway with wonder in their hearts, but also we must remember (Galway) people in England, in America, and round the world and maybe they are crying at this moment…People of Galway, we love you!"

The final phrase is an echo of Pope John Paul II's address to the young people of Ireland the previous year.  The celebrations did not just end with Connolly's speech as Joe McDonagh seized the microphone and lead the crowd in a version of the West's Awake.  Connolly rounded of the year by collecting an All-Star award, as well as being named as the Texaco Hurler of the Year.

1981 saw Galway reach a third consecutive All-Ireland final and Offaly were the opponents. Everything seemed to be going well for Connolly's side as Galway hoped to capture a second consecutive All-Ireland title. Offaly 'keeper Damien Martin was doing great work in batting out an almost certain Galway goal early in the second-half. With twenty-three minutes left in the game Galway led by six points, however, they failed to score for the rest of the game. Johnny Flaherty hand-passed Offaly's second goal with just three minutes remaining. At the long whistle Galway were defeated by 2–12 to 0–15.

The following few years proved difficult as Galway were knocked out of the championship at the All-Ireland semi-final stages in 1982 and 1983.  Connolly retired from inter-county hurling following a serious knee injury in 1984.

Inter-provincial
Connolly also lined out with Connacht in the inter-provincial series of games and enjoyed much success.

In 1979 Connolly was at centre-forward as Connacht reached the inter-provincial decider. A 1–13 to 1–9 defeat by Leinster was the result on that occasion. Connolly retained the same position on the team and was appointed captain in 1980 as Connacht faced Railway Cup specialists Munster in the decider. A low-scoring game followed, however, a 1–5 to 0–7 victory gave Connacht their first Railway Cup title since 1947. It was Connolly's first winners' medal in the inter-pro competition.

Connacht reached the Railway Cup final again in 1982. A 3–8 to 2–9 victory over Leinster gave Connolly his second Railway Cup medal.

Managerial career

Galway
In 2008 Connolly became a selector with the Galway senior hurling team, under the management of John McIntyre. The highlight of his three years as a selector was a 2–22 to 1–17 defeat of Cork in 2010 to take the National League title.

Castlegar
Connolly has also served as manager of the Castlegar senior hurling team.

Broadcasting
Connolly has served as a non-executive director of Irish-language channel TG4 for a number of years. He has also worked as an analyst on Seó Spóirt and has co-hosted reality show Jockey Eile with Seán Bán Breathnach.

Personal life
Born in Castlegar on the outskirts of Galway, Connolly was educated at Briarhill national school and later attended St Mary's College. After completing his Leaving Certificate in 1974, he completed a Bachelor of Arts in Irish and Geography at University College Galway, before later qualifying as a secondary school teacher in 1979. In spite of this he later worked as a sales director with Connolly Sports, a sportswear manufacturing company.

Honours

Player
University College Galway
Fitzgibbon Cup (1): 1976–77

Castlegar
All-Ireland Senior Club Hurling Championship (1): 1980
Connacht Senior Club Hurling Championship (2): 1979, 1984
Galway Senior Club Hurling Championship (2): 1979, 1984

Galway
All-Ireland Senior Hurling Championship (1): 1980

Connacht
Railway Cup (2): 1980 (c), 1982

Individual
Awards
Texaco Hurler of the Year (1): 1980
All-Star (1): 1980

External links

References

1956 births
Living people
All-Ireland Senior Hurling Championship winners
Alumni of the University of Galway
Castlegar hurlers
Gaelic games writers and broadcasters
Galway inter-county hurlers
Connacht inter-provincial hurlers
Hurling forwards
Hurling managers
Hurling selectors
University of Galway hurlers
TG4 people